Radhakrishnan Nagar (Dr. Radhakrishnan Nagar) or R. K. Nagar, is a legislative assembly constituency in the Indian state of Tamil Nadu. Its State Assembly Constituency number is 11. It is part of Chennai North Lok Sabha constituency. It is one of the 234 State Legislative Assembly Constituencies in Tamil Nadu, in India.

Members of the Legislative Assembly

Election results

2021

2017 By-election

2016

2015 By-election

2011

2006

2001

1996

1991

1989

1984

1980

1977

References

External links
 

Assembly constituencies of Tamil Nadu
Politics of Chennai